"Nothing Can Stop My Love" is a song recorded by American R&B singer Angela Clemmons for her second studio album, This Is Love (1987). It was written by Aldo Nova and Marty Simon, and produced by Nova. In 1991, it was covered in French by Canadian singer Celine Dion.

Celine Dion version

In 1991, Celine Dion recorded a French-language version of "Nothing Can Stop My Love", titled "Des mots qui sonnent" (meaning "Words That Have Meaning") for her album Dion chante Plamondon. The French lyrics were written by Luc Plamondon and the song was produced by Aldo Nova. Both Plamondon and Nova had already collaborated with Dion on her previous French album, Incognito (1987). "Des mots qui sonnent" was released as the first promotional single from Dion chante Plamondon in Canada in November 1991. The music video was directed by Alain DesRochers. "Des mots qui sonnent" peaked at number ten in Quebec.

Background and release
"Des mots qui sonnent" was later included on Dion's Canadian maxi-single "Beauty and the Beast".

Although "Des mots qui sonnent" was a radio release only, a music video was made, featuring Luc Plamondon and Aldo Nova as guest appearances. This video was directed by Alain Desrochers in October 1991. It was included later on the On ne change pas DVD (2005).

Live versions of "Des mots qui sonnent" can be found on Dion's 1994 À l'Olympia album and the Céline une seule fois / Live 2013 CD/DVD. The song also became a part of Dion's 2005 greatest hits CD, called On ne change pas.

"Des mots qui sonnent" entered the Quebec Airplay Chart on 25 November 1991 and peaked at number 10, spending 17 weeks on chart in total.

The title of the song is a play on words. Although literally meaning "words that sound", it can also mean "words that have meaning" (the French verb "sonner" meaning either "to sound" or "to have meaning"). The song is a narrative by Dion to a songwriter, in which she asks him or her to write her a hit song that will reach the top 10, and also mentions the accompanying video she will have to film among other things. The song is upbeat and has a rock feel, characteristic of a lot of Dion's early work and straying from the powerful ballads for which she has a reputation.

Critical reception
AllMusic editor Jose F. Promis wrote that Dion's voice exudes a passion beyond her young years, especially on the album's rocking opener, "Des mots qui sonnent".

Track listings and formats
Canadian promotional CD single
"Des mots qui sonnent" – 3:56

Charts

References

External links

1987 songs
1991 singles
1991 songs
Celine Dion songs
Columbia Records singles
French-language songs
Songs with lyrics by Luc Plamondon
Songs written by Aldo Nova